
This is a timeline of Irish history, comprising important legal and territorial changes and political events in Ireland.  To read about the background to these events, see History of Ireland. See also the list of Lords and Kings of Ireland, alongside Irish heads of state, and the list of years in Ireland.

 Prehistory / centuries: 1st2nd3rd4th5th6th7th8th9th10th11th12th13th14th15th16th17th18th19th20th21st

Mesolithic and neolithic periods

Bronze and Iron Ages

1st century

2nd century

3rd century

4th century

5th century

6th century

7th century

8th century

9th century

10th century

11th century

12th century

13th century

14th century

15th century

16th century

17th century

18th century

19th century

20th century

21st century

References

 01
 01

Ireland